Phystis is a monotypic genus of butterflies from southern United States in the family Nymphalidae. It contains the species Phystis simois.

Subspecies
P. s. chinchipensis (Hayward, 1964) (Peru)
P. s. pratti (Hall, 1935) (Peru)
P. s. simois (Hewitson, 1864) (Brazil)
P. s. variegata (Röber, 1913) (Brazil, Argentina, Uruguay, Bolivia, Peru)

References

Melitaeini
Monotypic butterfly genera
Taxa named by Robert P. Higgins